The Portal Eldorado, inaugurated in 2012, is one of the terminal stations of TransMilenio, the bus rapid transit system of Bogotá, Colombia.

Location 
The Portal Eldorado is located in the west of the city, on the Avenue El Dorado between the Avenue Ciudad de Cali and the transverse 93. It has accesses by pedestrian bridges located on These two ways.

It caters directly to the neighborhoods Santa Cecilia, Los Álamos and its surroundings. Nearby are the El Dorado International Airport, the Aloft Bogota Airport hotel, the Movich Buró 26 hotel, the Habiltel hotel, the main headquarters of Carvajal SA, the GlaxoSmithKline headquarters in Colombia, the Hipercentro warehouse Corona Dorado and Connecta business center, headquarters of several multinationals and visa offices for the embassies of Australia and the United States.

Etymology 
The Portal receives its name being the head station of the line Calle 26, and being located on the road axis of the same name. The Eldorado Avenue was baptized of this form since for a long time it was believed that the legend of Eldorado had its source in the muiscas rites of the lagoon of Guatavita, located about 40 kilometers from the city.

Story 
This station is part of Phase III of the TransMilenio system that began to be built in late 2009 and, after several delays related to corruption cases, began operations on Saturday 30 June 2012.

Current trunk services

Dual services

Feeding services 
To each side of the portal are located the stops of the feeder routes, which began to operate also on 30 June 2012 
Platform North (Engativá)
  circular to the neighborhood Tierra Grata.
  circular to the sector of Engativá Center.
  to the sector of Avenida Eldorado - Álamos.
  circular to the El Muelle neighborhood.
  circular to Villa Amalia neighborhood.
  to the La Faena neighborhood.
  to the  Eldorado Airport.
Platform South (Fontibón)
  to the La Estancia neighborhood.
  to the free zone sector.
  circular to the sector of Fontibon Center.
  to the Villemar district.
  to the sector of Avenida Cali - Hayuelos.

Complementary services 
The following complementary route also works:
  to the neighborhood Belén.

Circular Routes 
From 8 August 2016 a circular route of the SITP enters the portal:
  circular to the El Refugio neighborhood.

References

External links 
 TransMilenio
 Surumbo.com Official TransMilenio interactive mapping system

TransMilenio